Umm Tais National Park is on an uninhabited island on the northern tip of Qatar. It includes sand bars and small islets with mangroves. A number of migratory bird species also inhabit the island. It was established in 2006 during the 15th Asian Games. Ruins of an ancient village known as Al Mafjar are nearby and there are plans to develop it as a tourist attraction. It is also within four miles of the town of Ar Ru'ays.

See also
Natural areas of Qatar

References

National parks of Qatar
Protected areas of Qatar
2006 establishments in Qatar
Al Shamal